Cornelis Hoogendijk (1866 – 1911) was a Dutch art collector.

Hoogendijk was born in Krimpen aan den IJssel and studied law at Leiden University before entering the Rijksakademie van beeldende kunsten in Amsterdam. In the years 1890-1899 he built up an enormous collection of paintings, financed with the fortune he inherited from his father. The collection could be seen in his mansion on the Bezuidenhoutseweg in The Hague where he lived with his sisters. His family became alarmed and had him committed to Veldwijk asylum in Ermelo, where he later died. He is known as a major collector of modern art, including many paintings by Cézanne and Van Gogh. It is probably his connections to Van Gogh that caused him to be sent to the sanatorium in Ermelo, as that is also where Van Gogh's sister Wilhelmina was sent. In 1906 the Vereeniging tot Christelijke Verzorging van Geestes- en Zenuwzieken opened a new cemetery on the Horsterweg, where burials took place from 1908-1973. The most famous was Wilhelmina van Gogh, who was committed 4 December 1902 and thus must have met and known Hoogendijk there. After Hoogendijk was committed in 1899, the collection was liquidated by the family, but it took several years to do so.

In 1902 Hofstede de Groot catalogued 425 paintings, but it is known from old research into collections that the total number must have been much higher. A short sum of  25 sales in 1907, 371 in 1908, and 184 in 1912, show that various parties were busy picking and choosing among the artworks left over. Not included in this number are 48 works by Dutch Masters that were donated to the Rijksmuseum.

Hoogendijk died in Ermelo.

References 

 Cézanne en Van Gogh in het Rijksmuseum voor Moderne Kunst in Amsterdam: de collectie van Cornelis Hoogendijk (1866-1911), by Herbert Henkels in the Bulletin van het Rijksmuseum, Jaarg. 41, Nr. 3/4 (1993), pp. 155–287
Provenance mentions for Cornelis Hoogendijk's collection in RKDimages database

1866 births
People from South Holland
1911 deaths
Leiden University alumni
Art collectors from The Hague